Liu Heping (Chinese: 刘和平; born 1953) is a Chinese screenwriter and novelist who is best known for his historical dramas.

Biography 
Liu was born in Hunan Province, southern China in 1953. His father was a playwright, and his mother was an opera actor. His dramatisation of the final years of the Jiajing Emperor, Ming Dynasty in 1566, was released as a TV drama and a series of novels in 2007. In 2014, his drama about the Chinese Civil War, All Quiet in Peking, was also released in both TV and novel formats. Liu won the award for best screenplay for All Quiet in Peking at the 30th Feitian Awards.

Works

Notable works (Chinese)
 Ming Dynasty in 1566 (2007)
 All Quiet in Peking (2014)

Works in translation (English)
 1566: The Taoist Emperor (Translated by Wen Huang) (2020)
1566: The Imperial Governor (Translated by Wen Huang) (2021)
 1566: The Chief Eunuch (Translated by Wen Huang) (2022)
 1566: The Emperor's Nemesis (Translated by Wen Huang) (2022)
 All Quiet in Peking: Under Turbulent Skies (Translated by Teng Jimeng) (2022)
 All Quiet in Peking: Behind Closed Doors (Translated by Teng Jimeng) (2022)

References 

1953 births
Living people
Chinese screenwriters
Chinese novelists
Writers from Hunan